The Alpha Caper (also known as The Inside Job) is a 1973 American made-for-television crime thriller film directed by Robert Michael Lewis. It stars Henry Fonda as an embittered parole officer forced into early retirement, who decides to take revenge against the city officials by stealing a gold shipment being moved to a new depository.  The television film was the final production of producer Aubrey Schenck and was a television pilot for an American television series called Crime.

Cast
Henry Fonda
Leonard Nimoy
James McEachin
Larry Hagman
Elena Verdugo
John Marley
Noah Beery, Jr.
Paul Kent

See also
 List of American films of 1973

References

External links
 
 Time Out Film Guide, 2009 Edition

1973 films
1973 television films
1970s English-language films
1970s crime thriller films
ABC network original films
American heist films
Films produced by Harve Bennett
Television pilots not picked up as a series
Films directed by Robert Michael Lewis
1970s American films